Tukmakly (Tuqmaqlı) is a rural locality (a village) in Krasnokurtovsky Selsoviet, Arkhangelsky District, Bashkortostan, Russia. The population was 76 as of 2010. There are 3 streets.

Geography 
Tukmakly is located 24 km north of Arkhangelskoye (the district's administrative centre) by road. Sagitovo is the nearest rural locality.

References 

Rural localities in Arkhangelsky District